Ruwaished is a town in the far east of Jordan.  Administratively it belongs to Mafraq Governorate. It has a population of 14,400 (2010 estimate). Ruwaished is the farthest Jordanian settlement to the east. The Karameh Border Crossing between Jordan and Iraq administratively belongs to the Ruwaished Department. 

After the war on Iraq in 2003, about 800 refugees fled from Iraq to the Jordanian border, mostly Palestinians and Somalis, where they were allocated in the Ruwaished Refugee Camp in the No man's land between Jordan and Iraq.

Geography
The town is located in Mafraq Governorate about 240 km to the east of Amman. Ruwaished has a desert climate with an average annual precipitation of 82.9 mm.  About eight wadis converge in the plains of Ruwaished, making it the second largest water basin in the northern desert region after Azraq. the water floods from these wadis in the winter compensate for the low annual precipitation rate of Ruwaished. The town is at an elevation of 683 meters above sea level. 
It is also located on the desert highway connecting Jordan to Iraq. The town has a strategic importance from its location as a rest area for travelers to and from Iraq. There is also a military airport in Ruwaished.

History
It is not known exactly when was the Ruwaished basin first inhibited, however existing Roman water dams, such as the Burqu Dam, indicate that the basin has been used as a traffic stop by the Roman and Byzantine imperial armies, and marked the eastern borders of the Byzantine empire, or was part of the Roman vassal states.

During the War on Iraq in 2003, Ruwaished came to world attention, as tens of media correspondents used it as a base for their coverage of the war.

Demographics
The Jordan National Census of 2004 showed that the town of Ruwaished had a population of 12,098, of whom 55.5% were males and 44.5% females. Only 67.5% of the population were Jordanian citizens. Among the Jordanian citizens, 53.4% were males, while males made up 58% of the foreign nationals .

Economy

Agriculture constitutes the backbone of the town's legal economy. 
Due to its location in plains where eight wadis converge, there are several dams built in the Ruwaished basin, to efficiently utilize the winter floods in the wadis:
North Ruwaished (Abu Alsafa) Dam: has a capacity of 10.3 million m3.
Burqu Dam: Originally a Roman built dam and still in use, has a capacity of about 4 million m3.
Shaalan Dam: has a capacity of 1 million m3.
Alrisha Alsharqiyya Dam: has a capacity of 2 million m3.
Hadlat Dam: The largest dam with a capacity of 20 million m3.
Raqban Dam
Buwaidha Dam
However close to so many borders; for some time now the main economy of the town has been cross-border smuggling.

See also
Karameh Border Crossing
Mafraq Governorate

References

Populated places in Mafraq Governorate